The Jewish Music Festival, established in 1994, is an annual festival of Jewish music held in Berkeley, California, hosted by the Jewish Community Center of the East Bay. It has been held for  years. Notable guests have included Ben Sidran in 2014, among others.

There was no festival in 2020.

References

External links

Jewish Music Festival website
   
Festivals in the San Francisco Bay Area
Organizations based in Berkeley, California
Music festivals established in 1989
Music festivals in California
Jewish music festivals